The jackal buzzard (Buteo rufofuscus) is a fairly large African bird of prey.   The taxonomy of this species has caused some confusion in the past and it almost certainly belongs in a species complex with other African Buteo species. Some taxonomists have considered this species, the Archer's buzzard, and the augur buzzard to be the same superspecies.  Many taxonomists consider them all to be distinct, having different calls, different home ranges and variations in plumage.  This is a species that lives among mountains, and on adjacent savanna and grassland. It is resident and non-migratory throughout its range.

Description

The jackal buzzard is one of the two larger Buteo species native to Africa, alongside its close cousin, the augur buzzard. Adults may measure  in total length.

The adult jackal buzzard is strikingly plumaged and arguably one of the most "handsome" buzzards. It is almost black above with a rufous tail.  The primary flight feathers are blackish and the secondaries off-white, both barred with black. Below the chin and around the throat is mainly chestnut, and the rest of the underparts and the underwing coverts are rich rufous but for a contrasting black abdomen with faint white bars. The flight feathers from below present a large white panel, contrasting with black on the hand and black on the tips that form a dark trailing edge to the wing. Beyond its unmistakable colours, the jackal buzzard has a very short tail, broad wings, bulky body and large bill compared to most other buzzards but for the augur buzzard. The juvenile jackal buzzard is mainly brown above and a somewhat washed out rufous-buff brown below, often manifesting worn feathers that appear as lighter buffy or whitish streaking. The tail of the juvenile is usually buff-brown, with or without a somewhat creamy pale tip. The underwing of juvenile has black tips and whitish panel similar to adults but the inside of the wing is rufous-buff (similar to body feathers) streaked with brown. Sympatric with the jackal buzzard only in Namibia, the augur buzzard is usually distinctly paler at every stage of development than the jackal buzzard, especially lacking the rich underside tones of adults. However, both species have a melanistic form (rather rarer as far as is known in the jackal than the augur buzzard) which are very similar in appearance and may only be told apart by the melanistic augur having slight dark streaking on the white wing panels. An unlikely confusion species is the slightly larger bateleur, given its short rufous tail but the larger-headed, heavier set eagle bears a very distinct and particular head, wing and body shape and obvious distinct colours as adults. The juvenile bateleur may be confused with the similarly brown jackal buzzard but is much more dusky below with rather differing wing colour on its bulging wings.

The jackal buzzard has a call of a sharp, barking quality, weeah ka-ka-ka or kyaahh-ka-ka-ka. The female jackal buzzard voice is deeper than that of the male. The fact that its call is reminiscent of that of black-backed jackal, is believed to be the source of the species' common name. It has a lower tone than the call of the forest buzzard and is very different from the harsh crowing of the augur buzzard. It is also reminiscent of the call of the American red-tailed hawk.

Range and habitat
The jackal buzzard is endemic to southern Africa. Despite its limited range, it is a fairly common species of raptor. It inhabits most of South Africa, with an absence at some of the north-central part but common in the Transvaal. Thence the range extends in the west up to central Namibia and in east through Lesotho and Eswatini into south Mozambique and, to the west, in extreme southeast Botswana. It can adapt to both desert-like, arid conditions and areas with high rainfall and verdant plant life. Mostly it prefers to be close to grassland in which to execute most of its hunting. Although quite common and adaptable, jackal buzzards are not infrequently endangered by large man-made objects such as wind turbines, power-lines and steep-sided, massive reservoirs, in addition to poisoning of carcasses (targeted at jackals).

Behaviour

Pairs have noisy aerial displays, including outside the breeding season. However the aerial display of the pair on territory tends to be much less dramatic than that of the augur buzzard, usually confined to circling or gentle stooping. The breeding season peaks in July to December, but can range from as early as from May to as late as March. The large stick nest is built in a tree or on a crag, and is often reused and enlarged in subsequent seasons. Two creamy or bluish white eggs (or very rarely three) are laid at about three day intervals and incubated by the female only, although food is brought to her on the nest by the male. The eggs hatch in about 40 days, after a further 56–60 days they can attempt flight. The parents will attack intruders, including humans, who come too close to the nest. Siblicide has been widely reported but, presumably when food supply is ample, nests often produce two fledglings. At 70 days they become independent of the nest, but young birds may then be seen with the adult pair for some time. As in other tropical raptors compared to temperate-zone relatives, the breeding cycle is relatively elongated and clutch size relatively small in the jackal buzzard compared to temperate-zone Buteo species.

Dietary habits

The diet of the jackal buzzard is led mainly by small ground mammals, especially rodents. Other prey may include snakes, lizards, ground-feeding birds such as sandgrouse and gamebirds (or alternately the nestlings and fledglings of other birds), insects, and road-kills. Typically, this raptor still-hunts by dropping on its prey from a perch, often either trees or roadside poles or posts. It takes its prey almost exclusively on bare ground, including roads. It also may hunt by soaring or periodically hovering or hanging on updrafts. A study from Grahamstown, South Africa found the prey around nest to consist of assorted rat species (21 items), four-striped grass mouse (8 items) and two golden moles. On evidence, the jackal buzzard mainly takes small mammals during the nesting cycle and then switches to a largely carrion-based diet during the non-breeding season. Jackal buzzards have been recorded at various carrion, including many sheep and goat carcasses and placenta, as well as largely road-killed hares, springhares, springboks and steenboks. Despite being often recorded at carrion, the numerous scavengers in their range, largely vultures, jackals and occasionally hyenas, are larger and often aggressive towards other scavengers. Therefore, the jackal buzzard either only comes to carrion when other scavengers are done feasting or are entirely absent. They have an advantage in being less shy towards humans than larger birds of prey and scavengers and may be able to come to road-kills more quickly and may also gain an advantage in accessing large carcasses that they may not be able to penetrate without larger scavengers opening them up first. Larger and/or more dangerous live prey recorded to be taken by jackal buzzards has included adults of birds such as francolins and marsh owls, adult puff adders, adult greater cane rats and largely or exclusively the young of various mongoose, monitor lizards and Cape hyraxes.

References

Ferguson-Lees, Christie, Franklin, Mead and Burton Raptors of the World 
Ian Sinclair, Phil Hockey and Warwick Tarboton, SASOL Birds of Southern Africa (Struik 2002)

External links
 Jackal Buzzard - Species text in The Atlas of Southern African Birds

jackal buzzard
Birds of prey of Sub-Saharan Africa
Birds of Southern Africa
Fauna of South Africa
Endemic fauna of South Africa
jackal buzzard
jackal buzzard